CFGS may refer to:

 CFGS-DT - a Canadian French language television station serving as an affiliate of Noovo in Gatineau, Quebec, Canada
 China Film Giant Screen - a Chinese premium large film format company
 Churston Ferrers Grammar School

See also
 CFG (disambiguation)